Hardball is an American baseball sitcom that aired Sunday nights at 8:30 pm on Fox from September 4, 1994 to November 4, 1994. The series premiered in the middle of the 1994–95 Major League Baseball strike and was canceled around the time that the year's World Series would have been played.

Premise
The series focused on the players and staff of the Pioneers, a fictional American League baseball team. Among those shown were pitcher Dave Logan, who has been largely overlooked by MLB, catcher Mike Widmer, who is past his prime, team owner Mitzi Balzer, who is sharp-tongued and trying to get her team out of last place, public relations girl Lee Emory, who has her hands full with Mitzi and the team, center fielder Frank Valente, whose cocky high-priced "superstar" ways put him at odds with Dave. The first episode showed Mitzi firing the manager and replacing him with a timid man named Ernest "Happy" Talbot, who is unsure how to get the Pioneers working as a team.

Cast
 Bruce Greenwood as Dave Logan
 Mike Starr as Mike Widmer
 Joe Rogan as Frank Valente
 Phill Lewis as Arnold Nixon
 Chris Browning as Lloyd LaCombe
 Dann Florek as Ernest 'Happy' Talbot
 Steve Hytner as Brad Coolidge
 Alexandra Wentworth as Lee Emory
 Rose Marie as Mitzi Balzer
 Adam Hendershott as Nelson Balzer

Episodes

References

External links

1990s American sitcoms
1994 American television series debuts
1994 American television series endings
American sports television series
Baseball on television in the United States
Baseball television series
Television series by ABC Studios
English-language television shows
Fox Broadcasting Company original programming